Alakal is a 1974 Indian Malayalam film, directed and produced by M. D. Mathews. The film stars Rajesh, Vijayasree, Adoor Bhasi and Pattom Sadan in the lead roles. The film had musical score by V. Dakshinamoorthy.

Cast

Rajesh
Vijayasree
Adoor Bhasi
Pattom Sadan
Sankaradi
T. R. Omana
Paul Vengola
Dr. Chinnayyan
Kavitha
Leela
Meena
P. O. Thomas
Shyamkumar

Soundtrack
The music was composed by V. Dakshinamoorthy and the lyrics were written by Mankombu Gopalakrishnan.

References

External links
 

1974 films
1970s Malayalam-language films